The 2019 FC Cincinnati season was the club's debut season in Major League Soccer (MLS), and the fourth season of a team playing under the FC Cincinnati brand after three years in the lower-division United Soccer League (since renamed the USL Championship). The club finished with a league worst 6–22–6 record in their inaugural MLS season, setting a league record for the most goals given up with 75. FC Cincinnati missed the playoffs.

Club

Coaching staff 

Head coach Alan Koch was fired on May 7, 2019, after a 2–7–2 start to the 2019 season. Yoann Damet served as interim coach until Ron Jans was named head coach on August 3, 2019, becoming the third head coach since the club moved to the MLS.

Roster

2019 MLS SuperDraft picks

Player movement

In

Out

Loans in

Loans out

Competitions

Major League Soccer

League tables

Eastern Conference

Overall

Results

Statistics

Appearances and goals 

Numbers after plus-sign(+) denote appearances as a substitute.

|-
! colspan=12 style=background:#dcdcdc; text-align:center|Goalkeepers

|-
! colspan=12 style=background:#dcdcdc; text-align:center|Defenders

|-
! colspan=12 style=background:#dcdcdc; text-align:center|Midfielders

|-
! colspan=12 style=background:#dcdcdc; text-align:center|Forwards

|-
! colspan="14" style="background:#dcdcdc; text-align:center"| Left Club During Season

Top scorers 
{| class="wikitable" style="font-size: 100%; text-align: center;"
|-
! style="background:#003087; color:#FFFFFF; border:2px solid #FE5000;" scope="col"|Rank
! style="background:#003087; color:#FFFFFF; border:2px solid #FE5000;" scope="col"|Position
! style="background:#003087; color:#FFFFFF; border:2px solid #FE5000;" scope="col"|Number
! style="background:#003087; color:#FFFFFF; border:2px solid #FE5000;" scope="col"|Name
! style="background:#003087; color:#FFFFFF; border:2px solid #FE5000;" scope="col"|
! style="background:#003087; color:#FFFFFF; border:2px solid #FE5000;" scope="col"|
! style="background:#003087; color:#FFFFFF; border:2px solid #FE5000;" scope="col"|
! style="background:#003087; color:#FFFFFF; border:2px solid #FE5000;" scope="col"|Total
|-
| 1
|MF
|15
|align="left"| Allan Cruz
|7
|0
|0
|7
|-
|2
|MF
|45
|align="left"| Emmanuel Ledesma
|6
|0
|0
|6
|-
|3
|FW
|31
|align="left"| Kekuta Manneh
|4
|0
|1
|5
|-
|4
| FW
|11
|align="left"| Darren Mattocks
|3
|0
|0
|3
|-
|5
| FW
|9
|align="left"| Fanendo Adi
|1
|0
|1
|2
|-
| rowspan="8"|6
|DF
|2
|align="left"| Kendall Waston
|1
|0
|0
|1
|-
|MF
|6
|align="left"| Leonardo Bertone
|1
|0
|0
|1
|-
|MF
|7
|align="left"| Roland Lamah
|1
|0
|0
|1
|-
|DF
|17
|align="left"| Mathieu Deplagne
|1
|0
|0
|1
|-
| MF
|27
|align="left"| Fatai Alashe
|1
|0
|0
|1
|-
|MF
|93
|align="left"| Kenny Saief
|1
|0
|0
|1
|-
|FW
|81
|align="left"| Rashawn Dally
|1
|0
|0
|1
|-
|MF
|8
|align="left"| Víctor Ulloa
|1
|0
|0
|1
|-
!colspan="4"|Total
! 29
! 0
! 2
! 31

Top assists 
{| class="wikitable" style="font-size: 100%; text-align: center;"
|-
! style="background:#003087; color:#FFFFFF; border:2px solid #FE5000;" scope="col"|Rank
! style="background:#003087; color:#FFFFFF; border:2px solid #FE5000;" scope="col"|Position
! style="background:#003087; color:#FFFFFF; border:2px solid #FE5000;" scope="col"|Number
! style="background:#003087; color:#FFFFFF; border:2px solid #FE5000;" scope="col"|Name
! style="background:#003087; color:#FFFFFF; border:2px solid #FE5000;" scope="col"|
! style="background:#003087; color:#FFFFFF; border:2px solid #FE5000;" scope="col"|
! style="background:#003087; color:#FFFFFF; border:2px solid #FE5000;" scope="col"|
! style="background:#003087; color:#FFFFFF; border:2px solid #FE5000;" scope="col"|Total
|-
|1
|MF
|45
| align="left"| Emmanuel Ledesma
| 4
| 0
| 1
| 5
|-
| rowspan="3"|2
|FW
|31
| align="left"| Kekuta Manneh
| 3
| 0
| 0
| 3
|-
| FW
| 11
| align="left"| Darren Mattocks
| 3
| 0
| 0
| 3
|-
|FW
|7
|align="left"| Roland Lamah
| 3
| 0
| 0
| 3
|-
|rowspan="4"|3
| MF
| 93
| align="left"| Kenny Saief
| 2
| 0
| 0
| 2
|-
| MF
| 6
| align="left"| Leonardo Bertone
| 2
| 0
| 0
| 2
|-
|MF
| 8
|align="left"| Víctor Ulloa
| 2
| 0
| 0
| 2
|-
|DF
|17
|align="left"| Mathieu Deplagne
| 2
| 0
| 0
| 2
|-
|rowspan="4"|4
|MF
|19
|align="left"| Eric Alexander
| 1
| 0
| 0
| 1
|-
|MF
| 15
|align="left"| Allan Cruz
| 1
| 0
| 0
| 1
|-
|DF
|96
|align="left"| Andrew Gutman
| 1
| 0
| 0
| 1
|-
| 36
| MF
| align="left"| Joe Gyau
| 1
| 0
| 0
| 1
|-
!colspan="4"|Total
! 25
! 0
! 1
! 26

Disciplinary record 
{| class="wikitable" style="font-size: 100%; text-align:center;"
|-
| rowspan="2" !width=15|
| rowspan="2" !width=15|
| rowspan="2" !width=120|Player
| colspan="3"|MLS
| colspan="3"|MLS Playoffs
| colspan="3"|U.S. Open Cup
| colspan="3"|Total
|-
!width=34; background:#fe9;|
!width=34; background:#fe9;|
!width=34; background:#ff8888;|
!width=34; background:#fe9;|
!width=34; background:#fe9;|
!width=34; background:#ff8888;|
!width=34; background:#fe9;|
!width=34; background:#fe9;|
!width=34; background:#ff8888;|
!width=34; background:#fe9;|
!width=34; background:#fe9;|
!width=34; background:#ff8888;|
|-
|-
|| 6 ||MF ||align=left| Leonardo Bertone || |9|| |0|| |0|| |0|| |0|| |0|| |0|| |0|| |0|| 9|| |0|| |0
|-
|| 2 ||DF ||align=left| Kendall Waston || |8|| |1|| |0|| |0|| |0|| |0|| |0|| |0|| |0|| |8|| |1|| |0
|-
| 15 ||MF ||align=left| Allan Cruz || |5|| |0|| |0|| |0|| |0|| |0|| |0|| |0|| |0|| 5|| |0|| |0
|-
|| 8 ||MF ||align=left| Víctor Ulloa || |4|| |0|| |0|| |0|| |0|| |0|| |0|| |0|| |0|| 4|| |0|| |0
|-
|| 45 ||MF ||align=left| Emmanuel Ledesma || |4|| |0|| |0|| |0|| |0|| |0|| |0|| |0|| |0|| 4|| |0|| |0
|-
|| 17 ||DF || align=left| Mathieu Deplagne || |4|| |0|| |0|| |0|| |0|| |0|| |0|| |0|| |0|| 4|| |0|| |0
|-
| 14 ||DF ||align=left| Nick Hagglund || |2|| |0|| |0|| |0|| |0|| |0|| |1|| |0|| |0|| 3|| |0|| |0
|-
|| 32 ||DF ||align=left| Justin Hoyte || |3|| |0|| |0|| |0|| |0|| |0|| |0|| |0|| |0|| 3|| |0|| |0
|-
|| 33 ||MF ||align=left| Caleb Stanko || |3|| |0|| |0|| |0|| |0|| |0|| |0|| |0|| |0|| 3|| |0|| |0
|-
|| 3 ||DF ||align=left| Forrest Lasso || |2|| |0|| |0|| |0|| |0|| |0|| |0|| |0|| |0|| 2|| |0|| |0
|-
|| 24 ||MF ||align=left| Frankie Amaya || |2|| |0|| |0|| |0|| |0|| |0|| |0|| |0|| |0|| 2|| |0|| |0
|-
|| 9 ||FW ||align=left| Fanendo Adi || |1|| |0|| |0|| |0|| |0|| |0|| |1|| |0|| |0|| 2|| |0|| |0
|-
|| 23 ||DF || align=left| Maikel van der Werff || |2|| |0|| |0|| |0|| |0|| |0|| |0|| |0|| |0|| 2|| |0|| |0
|-
|| 96 ||DF || align=left| Andrew Gutman || |2|| |0|| |0|| |0|| |0|| |0|| |0|| |0|| |0|| 2|| |0|| |0
|-
|| 27 ||MF ||align=left| Fatai Alashe || |2|| |0|| |0|| |0|| |0|| |0|| |0|| |0|| |0|| 2|| |0|| |0
|-
|| 4 ||DF || align=left| Greg Garza || |1|| |0|| |0|| |0|| |0|| |0|| |0|| |0|| |0|| 1|| |0|| |0
|-
| 18 ||GK ||align=left| Spencer Richey || |1|| |0|| |0|| |0|| |0|| |0|| |0|| |0|| |0|| 1|| |0|| |0
|-
|| 92 ||DF || align=left| Alvas Powell || |1|| |0|| |0|| |0|| |0|| |0|| |0|| |0|| |0|| 1|| |0|| |0
|-
|| 31 ||FW ||align=left| Kekuta Manneh || |0|| |0|| |1|| |0|| |0|| |0|| |1|| |0|| |0|| 1|| |0|| |1
|-
| 7 ||MF ||align=left| Roland Lamah ||0|| |0|| |1|| |0|| |0|| |0|| |0|| |0|| |0|| 0|| |0|| |1
|-
| 36 ||MF ||align=left| Joe Gyau ||0|| |0|| |1|| |0|| |0|| |0|| |0|| |0|| |0|| 0|| |0|| |1
|-
!colspan=3|Total !!56!!1!!3!!0!!0!!0!!3!!0!!0!!59!!1!!3

Clean sheets
{| class="wikitable sortable" style="text-align: center;"
|-
! style="background:#003087; color:#FFFFFF; border:2px solid #FE5000;" scope="col"| No.
! style="background:#003087; color:#FFFFFF; border:2px solid #FE5000;" scope="col"|Name
! style="background:#003087; color:#FFFFFF; border:2px solid #FE5000;" scope="col"| MLS
! style="background:#003087; color:#FFFFFF; border:2px solid #FE5000;" scope="col"| U.S. Open Cup
! style="background:#003087; color:#FFFFFF; border:2px solid #FE5000;" scope="col"| Total
! style="background:#003087; color:#FFFFFF; border:2px solid #FE5000;" scope="col"| Games played
|-
| 18
| align=left| Spencer Richey
|2||0||2||19
|-
| 22
| align=left| Przemysław Tytoń
|3||0||3||17
|-

Honors and awards

MLS Team of the Week

MLS Goal of the Week

MLS Coach of the Week

References 

2019 Major League Soccer season
American soccer clubs 2019 season
FC Cincinnati
2019